L'Ex de ma vie is a 2014 French comedy film directed by Dorothée Sebbagh.

Plot 
Ariane, a young French violinist, agrees inflamed marriage proposal Christen, an irresistible conductor. Only problem: she is still a little ... married! Separated for two years with Nino, an Italian schoolteacher with a strong character, she manages to convince him to follow her to Paris for divorce in 8 days flat. But their trip for two in the city of love looks much more eventful than expected ...

Cast 
 Géraldine Nakache as Ariane
 Kim Rossi Stuart as Nino
 Pascal Demolon as Christen
 Catherine Jacob as Daphné
 Sophie Cattani as Barbara
 Nicole Ferroni as The guide

References

External links 

2014 films
2014 comedy films
Films about divorce
French comedy films
2010s French films